Edward Martindel (July 8, 1876 – May 4, 1955) was an American stage and film actor who appeared on Broadway and in more than 80 films between 1915 and 1946. 

Born in Hamilton, Ohio, he was the son of Dr. and Mrs. Frank Martindell. His singing debut came under the management of Henry Savage. He appeared in 16 Broadway plays, beginning with Dolly Varden (1902) and ending with The Little Blue Devil (1919). 

He died on May 4, 1955 in Los Angeles, California, from a heart attack. His grave is located at Chapel of the Pines Crematory.

Selected filmography

References

External links

 
 
Edward Martindel photographs at silenthollywood.com

1876 births
1955 deaths
Male actors from Ohio
American male film actors
American male silent film actors
20th-century American male actors
Burials at Chapel of the Pines Crematory